Emanuel Lukanov (born 25 May 1975) is a Bulgarian retired football defender and currently manager of Etar Veliko Tarnovo.

Lukanov has 8 caps for the Bulgaria U21 national side.

Born May 25, 1975 in Veliko Tarnovo. He is 181 cm tall and weighs 75 kg. He played for FC Etar (Veliko Tarnovo) and the Italian Dertona, Pergocrema 1932, Chiari 1912, Nuova Verolese Calcio. Winner of the PFL Cup in 1995 with Etar. The "A" group played 73 games and scored 4 goals. There are 4 matches for Etar in the Intertoto tournament. Since the autumn of 2006 he has been playing coach of Nuova Verolise. In 2015 he won the Champion Cup of Bulgaria with PFC Cherno More, Varna, as assistant coach of the representative team. He had a training session at UEFA campus in Nyon, Switzerland where he attended. Also was a coach in the first INTER Academy Camp 2018 in Bulgaria.

Football career 
1994-1997 FC Etar (Veliko Tarnovo), Bulgaria

1997-1999 FC Dertona C.G

1999-2000 FC Etar (Veliko Tarnovo), Bulgaria

2000-2003 U.S. Pergocrema 1932, Cremona, Italy

2003-2004 A.C. Chiari 1912, Bresha, Italy

2005-2010 Nuova Verolese Calcio A.S.D., Brescia, Italy

Coach career 
In July 2010, Lukanov began working as a coach at the Youth Academy of the Cherno More (Varna). In October of that year he was recruited as an assistant of Stefan Genov in the first team. He worked for 7 years as assistant coach of the Cherno More, and during this period he also assisted Nikola Spassov, Adalbert Zafirov and Georgi Ivanov.

On December 31, 2016, Lukanov finished a coaching course and obtained a UEFA PRO license. In September 2017, he was confirmed as a senior coach of the Cherno More, replacing Georgi Ivanov's resignation.

In July 2018 INTER Academy made their first INTER Academy Camp in Bulgaria and Emanuel Lukanov was one of the coaches.

In November 2018 he became part of the coach team of Ivaylo Petev in Al-Qadsiah, Arabia Saudi.

In January 2020, Lukanov started working in the coaching team of Ivaylo Petev in Jagiellonia Białystok. (till 1 September 2020)

In June 2021, he became part of the coach team in Beroe as an assistant & fitness coach.

On 6 June 2022, Lukanov was announced as the new manager of Etar Veliko Tarnovo.

References

External links
Profile at calciatori.com

1975 births
Living people
Bulgarian footballers
Association football defenders
First Professional Football League (Bulgaria) players
Bulgarian expatriate footballers
Expatriate footballers in Italy
Bulgarian expatriate sportspeople in Italy
Bulgarian football managers
PFC Cherno More Varna managers
FC Etar Veliko Tarnovo players
A.S.D. HSL Derthona players
People from Veliko Tarnovo
Sportspeople from Veliko Tarnovo Province